German occupations of Luxembourg may refer to:

 The garrison of the German Confederation in Luxembourg (1815–1867)
 German occupation of Luxembourg during World War I (1914–1918)
 German occupation of Luxembourg during World War II (1940–1945)